Park Hwayobi (February 11, 1982), more commonly known as Hwayobi, is a South Korean R&B singer-songwriter.

Profile
Hwayobi is regarded South Korea's “Queen of R&B”. Hwayobi won awards for Best Female R&B artist and Best Female Ballad Singer from the Korean Entertainment Art Awards in 2005 and 2006. Her appearance on the variety show We Got Married in 2008 increased her popularity among the Korean public. She also appeared on Immortal Songs: Singing the Legend.

Discography

Studio albums

Extended plays

Singles

Soundtrack appearances
 2004.10.12: 두번째 프러포즈 OST (Second Propose) : Track 03 - 잊혀진 계절
 2005.05.25: 패션 70's OST (Fashion 70's) : Track 08 - 그림자
 2008.12.24: 스타의 연인 OST (Star's Lover) : Track 02 - 내겐 어려운 그 말
 2009.10.29: 수상한 삼형제 OST (Three Brothers) : Track 05 - 마취 (Anesthesia)
 2009.11.09: 내 눈에 콩깍지 OST (The Relation Of Face, Mind And Love) : Track 05 - 사랑탓 (Love Fault)
2010.02.16: OB/GYN Doctors OST : Track 02 -  늦은 사랑 (Late Love)
2011.05.28 Miss Ripley OST Part.1 (미스리플리)유리 (Glass)
2012.02.20 Korean Peninsula OST Part.2 (한반도)만약에 우리 둘 중 하나라도 (If We Were)
2012.02.20 Korean Peninsula OST Part.2 (한반도)Cheonguk (천국)
2012.12.10 My Love, Madame Butterfly OST Part.2 (내 사랑 나비부인)

Variety Shows
 We Got Married (Season 1: Episodes 25, 29-44) - with Hwanhee
 MasterChef Korea Celebrity

Awards
 Seoul Music Awards Rookie of the Year (2000)
 The 12th Republic of Korea Entertainment Art Award category R&B Singer Women (2005)
 The 13th Korea Entertainment Art Awards "Best Ballad Artist (Female)" (2006)
 MBC Broadcast Entertainment Awards Best Brand Award Prize (2008)

Notes

References

External links

 

1982 births
Living people
South Korean women pop singers
South Korean female idols
South Korean rhythm and blues singers
21st-century South Korean singers
21st-century South Korean women singers